Trigonopterus lampungensis is a species of flightless weevil in the genus Trigonopterus from Indonesia.

Etymology
The specific name is derived from that of the Indonesian province of Lampung.

Description
Individuals measure 1.96–2.40 mm in length.  General coloration is a dark rust-color ranging to black, with light rust-colored antennae.

Range

Phylogeny
T. lampungensis is part of the T. dimorphus species group.

References

lampungensis
Beetles described in 2014
Beetles of Asia
Insects of Indonesia